Kirovsky (masculine), Kirovskaya (feminine), or Kirovskoye (neuter) is the name of several inhabited localities in Russia.

Urban localities
Kirovsky, Astrakhan Oblast, a work settlement in Kamyzyaksky District of Astrakhan Oblast
Kirovsky, Kursk Oblast, a work settlement in Pristensky District of Kursk Oblast
Kirovsky, Primorsky Krai, an urban-type settlement in Kirovsky District of Primorsky Krai

Rural localities
Kirovsky, Loktevsky District, Altai Krai, a settlement in Kirovsky Selsoviet of Loktevsky District of Altai Krai
Kirovsky, Smolensky District, Altai Krai, a settlement in Kirovsky Selsoviet of Smolensky District of Altai Krai
Kirovsky, Topchikhinsky District, Altai Krai, a settlement in Kirovsky Selsoviet of Topchikhinsky District of Altai Krai
Kirovsky, Amur Oblast, a settlement in Zeysky District of Amur Oblast
Kirovsky, Belgorod Oblast, a settlement in Ivnyansky District of Belgorod Oblast
Kirovsky, name of several other rural localities
Kirovskaya, Rostov Oblast, a stanitsa in Kagalnitsky District of Rostov Oblast
Kirovskaya, Tyumen Oblast, a village in Armizonsky District of Tyumen Oblast
Kirovskoye, Altai Krai, a selo in Aleysky District of Altai Krai
Kirovskoye, Republic of Bashkortostan, a village in Iglinsky District of the Republic of Bashkortostan
Kirovskoye, name of several other rural localities